General elections were held in Bermuda on 18 May 1976. The ruling United Bermuda Party remained in power after winning 25 of the 36 seats in the House of Assembly, with the opposition Progressive Labour Party gaining one seat, giving it a total of eleven.

Results

References

Bermuda
1976 in Bermuda
Elections in Bermuda
Election and referendum articles with incomplete results